The Kleines Meer ("Little Lake"), also called the Hieve, is a lake in East Frisia. It lies northeast of Emden on the territory of the municipality of Hinte; its southwestern shore borders on the borough of Emden, its southeastern and eastern shores on the municipality of Südbrookmerland.

The Kleines Meer is popular as a leisure and recreation spot, especially with dinghy sailors, surfers, anglers and weekenders. Little holiday chalets, the so-called Meerbuden, have been built along the Emden, Hinte and Südbrookmerland shores. Unlike the Großes Meer, motor boats are allowed on the shortest route on the Hieve, but may not exceed  in order to protect the natural habitat and the banks of the lake shore.

There is a link to the rest of the East Frisian waterways network along its only outlet, the Kurze Tief; this flows into the Treckfahrtstief, which, in turn, links to the canal network of the town of Emden and eventually to the River Ems.

External links

Lakes of Lower Saxony
East Frisia
LKleines Meer
Aurich (district)